The brill (Scophthalmus rhombus) is a species of flatfish in the turbot family (Scophthalmidae) of the order Pleuronectiformes. Brill can be found in the northeast Atlantic, Black Sea, Baltic Sea, and Mediterranean, primarily in deeper offshore waters.

Brill have slender bodies, brown covered with lighter and darker coloured flecks, excluding the tailfin; the underside of the fish is usually cream coloured or pinkish white. Like other flatfish the brill has the ability to match its colour to the surroundings. Part of the dorsal fin of the fish is not connected to the fin membrane, giving the fish a frilly appearance. They are sometimes confused with the turbot (Scophthalmus maximus), which is more diamond-shaped. The two species are related and can produce hybrids.
On the west coast of Canada (outside the range of Scophthalmus rhombus) local fisherman refer to the petrale sole, Eopsetta jordani, as brill.
The flesh is lighter in texture, more friable - even "floury" - and considerably less rich in flavour than the turbot, which is preferred by chefs.

Name in other languages

Sources
 Scophthalmus rhombus Marine Life Encyclopedia

References

External links

 Brill, in "What Am I Eating?" (a food dictionary)

Scophthalmus
Commercial fish
Marine fish of Europe
Fish of the Black Sea
Fish of the Mediterranean Sea
Fish described in 1758
Taxa named by Carl Linnaeus